Ximena Cecilia Rincón González (born 5 July 1968) is a Chilean lawyer and politician. She is formerly Chile's Labor Minister and former  Minister Secretary-General of the Presidency under President Michelle Bachelet.

Between 2005 and 2006 she was intendant of the Santiago Metropolitan Region.

In 2017 was elected Senator in representation of Maule Region. In 2021 was elected President of the Senate of Chile, replacing Yasna Provoste.

In the 2022 Chilean national plebiscite, Rincón supported the option to reject the drafted constitution, despite her party, the Christian Democratic Party, supporting the option to approve. This has led to a split between the party and many of its adherents, including Rincón, whose brother Ricardo, a former DC deputy, is said to be starting a new party reportedly called either the Democratic Party or the Democrats. On 27 October 2022, Rincón resigned from the Christian Democratic Party after 40 years of being a party member.

References

Government ministers of Chile
1968 births
Living people
Chilean people of Spanish descent
Chilean Ministers Secretary General of the Presidency
Christian Democratic Party (Chile) politicians
Democrats (Chile) politicians
Intendants of Santiago Metropolitan Region
Chilean women lawyers
University of Chile alumni
People from Concepción, Chile
Women government ministers of Chile
20th-century Chilean lawyers
20th-century women lawyers
Presidents of the Senate of Chile
Senators of the LV Legislative Period of the National Congress of Chile
Senators of the LVI Legislative Period of the National Congress of Chile